Club Deportivo San Fernando was a Spanish football team based in San Fernando, Cádiz, in the autonomous community of Andalusia. Founded in 1940 it was dissolved on 16 June 2009, due a €2 million debt. The club's home ground was Estadio Bahía Sur, with a capacity of 12,000 seats.

History
CD San Fernando was founded by a Cantabrian immigrant, after a merger of three teams from the city: San Fernando FC, Atlético San Fernando and CD Arsenal. During the 1960s, it became one of Andalusia's most important clubs, going on to play ten straight seasons in Segunda División the first being 1954–55 after dispatching Real Murcia in the playoffs: in 1957–58 it finished a best-ever sixth, only two points behind second-placed CD Tenerife, leaving the category with a total of 426 goals scored.

After years of competing mainly in Tercera División – in 1977 Segunda División B was created as the new third division – San Fernando was dissolved in 2009. As with most clubs that disappear due to financial difficulties, a new club emerged from the ashes, being named San Fernando CD.

Season to season

10 seasons in Segunda División
8 seasons in Segunda División B
41 seasons in Tercera División

Last squad (2008–09)

Famous players
 Marcelo Trobbiani
 José Cantón
 Miguel Llera
 Enrique Montero
 Antoni Ramallets

References

External links
Official website 
Unofficial website 

Association football clubs established in 1940
Association football clubs disestablished in 2009
Defunct football clubs in Andalusia
1940 establishments in Spain
2009 disestablishments in Spain
Segunda División clubs
Sport in San Fernando, Cádiz